Regina City is a former provincial electoral division in the Canadian province of Saskatchewan. 

Regina City elected a single MLA 1905 to 1917. It elected two members 1921 to 1948, three members in 1952 and 1956, and four members in 1960. In each election where Regina elected multiple MLAs, each voter could cast as many votes as there were seats to be filled (block voting).

Its MLA 1916-1922 was Premier William Melville Martin.

The district of Regina City existed from 1905 to 1964 when it was divided into:
Regina East (2 members)
Regina North
Regina South
Regina West (2 members)

MLAs
James Franklin Bole, Liberal (1905-1916)
William Melville Martin, Liberal (1916-1922)
James Albert Cross, Liberal (1921-1925)
Donald Alexander McNiven, Liberal (1922-1929)
M. A. MacPherson, Conservative (1925-1934)
James Grassick, Conservative (1929-1934)
Percy McCuaig Anderson, Liberal (1934-1944)
William Franklin Kerr, Liberal (1934-1938)
Bamm David Hogarth, Liberal (1938)
Bernard J. McDaniel, Liberal (1938-1944)
Charles Cromwell Williams, CCF (1944-1964)
Clarence Melvin Fines, CCF (1944-1960)
Marjorie Alexandra Cooper, CCF (1952-1964)
Allan Emrys Blakeney, CCF (1960-1964)
Edward Charles Whelan, CCF (1960-1964)

Election results

References

Former provincial electoral districts of Saskatchewan